Appalachian Highway may refer to:
Appalachian Development Highway System
Ohio State Route 32
APD-40 
Appalachian Highway (auto trail)